USCGC Joseph Napier is a  homeported in San Juan, Puerto Rico.
She is the fifteenth Sentinel class to be delivered, and the third of six to be assigned to Puerto Rico. she was commissioned on 29 January 2016.

Like her sister ships, she is equipped for coastal security patrols, interdiction of drug and people smugglers, and search and rescue. Like the smaller  she is equipped with a stern launching ramp. The ramp allows the deployment and retrieval of her high speed water-jet powered pursuit boat without first coming to a stop.

Operational history

Joseph Napier intercepted a fishing vessel in February 2017, that was attempting to smuggle over four tons of cocaine.  Lady Michelles crew of four individuals from Guyana were taken to the U.S. Virgin Islands, for prosecution. The cocaine's street value was estimated at US$125 million.

Namesake

She is named after Joseph Napier, who had commanded a lifeboat station at St. Joseph, Michigan.
Napier was an employee of the United States Lifeboat Service, one of the precursor services that were amalgamated into the Coast Guard.

Lore
Being one of seven FRC's   home ported in San Juan, Puerto Rico is a big job and eventually each boat carves out their own niche. The USCGC Joseph Napier (WPC-1115) has carved out that spot being known as "El bote de gente soñolienta". The crew of the aptly named Bote de gente soñolienta can often been seen lounging on the outside decks on beanbag chairs or logging countless hours of rack ops in an attempt to break the long-standing record held by the USCGC .

References

Sentinel-class cutters
Ships of the United States Coast Guard
2015 ships
Ships built in Lockport, Louisiana